The 1974 Macdonald Lassies Championship, the Canadian women's curling championship was held February 24 to 28, 1974 at the Victoria Memorial Arena in Victoria, British Columbia. The attendance for the week was 25,024.

Team Saskatchewan, who was skipped by Emily Farnham won the event by finishing round robin play undefeated with a 9–0 record. This was Saskatchewan's sixth consecutive championship and seventh overall. This was the only national championship appearance for Farnham. The event capped a stellar season for the team, which won 120 out of 122 games, with one of their two losses coming against a men's team.

Teams
The teams are listed as follows:

Standings
Final round robin standings

References

External links
Coverage on CurlingZone

Scotties Tournament of Hearts
Macdonald Lassies
Curling in British Columbia
Sports competitions in Victoria, British Columbia
1974 in British Columbia
February 1974 sports events in Canada
20th century in Victoria, British Columbia